The Red River freshwater swamp forests ecoregion (WWF ID:IM0147) covers the freshwater portion of the Hong River ("Red River") delta in northern Vietnam.  The ecoregion is separated from the sea by a thin coastal strip of the saltwater mangroves of the Indochina mangroves ecoregion.  Very little of the little ecosystem remains; most of the delta has been converted to urbanization, industry, or agriculture.  Less than 1% of the ecoregion is protected in significantly sized tracts.

Location and description 
The ecoregion is relatively small, just under 11,000 km2, limited to the flat river delta of the Hong River, centered on the cities of Hanoi in the center and Haiphong at the river mouth.  The ecoregion is separated from the actual sea coast by a thin strip of the Indochina mangroves ecoregion in the saltwater-affected zone.  To the north is the South China-Vietnam subtropical evergreen forests ecoregion, and to the west are the Northern Indochina subtropical moist forests and Northern Vietnam lowland rain forests ecoregions.

Climate 
The climate of the ecoregion is Dry-winter humid subtropical climate (Köppen climate classification (Cwa)). Precipitation in the wet summer months is ten time or more the average of the winter months.

Flora and fauna 
Inland of the saltwater mangroves are the freshwater swamp forests, at least in the areas not converted to human use.  The forest cover is generally limited to strips along the rivers.  Only about 1% (about 100 km2) of the ecoregion is in a core natural state, although 17% is in some form of forest cover, mostly of open evergreen broadleaf trees.

References 

Indomalayan ecoregions
Ecoregions of Vietnam
Tropical and subtropical moist broadleaf forests